Arja Lehtinen (born 23 April 1936) is a Finnish gymnast. She competed in seven events at the 1952 Summer Olympics.

References

1936 births
Living people
Finnish female artistic gymnasts
Olympic gymnasts of Finland
Gymnasts at the 1952 Summer Olympics
Sportspeople from Helsinki
20th-century Finnish women